Zila Lafleur (born 2 March 1997) is a Haitian footballer who plays as a midfielder. She has been a member of the Haiti women's national team.

Club career
Lafleur has played for Camp Nous Academy in Haiti.

International career
Lafleur represented Haiti at the 2013 CONCACAF Women's U-17 Championship. She capped at senior level during the 2014 Central American and Caribbean Games.

References

1997 births
Living people
Haitian women's footballers
Women's association football midfielders
Haiti women's international footballers
Competitors at the 2014 Central American and Caribbean Games